Lemberg is the German name for the city of Lviv in Ukraine. It may also refer to:

Places

Settlements
Lemberg, Saskatchewan, a municipality in Canada
Lemberg, Moselle, a municipality in Lorraine, France
Lemberg, Germany, a municipality in Rhineland-Palatinate, Germany
Lemberg pri Šmarju, a town near Šmarje pri Jelšah, Slovenia
Lemberg pri Novi Cerkvi a town near Vojnik, Slovenia
Sankt Magdalena am Lemberg, a village in Styria, Austria

Facilities and structures
Lemberg Castle, Lemberg, Germany
Lemberg Airport, Lemberg, Saskatchewan, Canada
Lemberg University, now Lviv University in Lviv, Ukraine

Geographic features
Hills or mountains in Germany

Lemberg (Swabian Jura) (1,015 m), the highest mountain in the Swabian Jura, east of Rottweil, Baden-Württemberg, southern Germany
 Lemberg (Nahe) (422 m), a hill on the river Nahe, Rhineland-Palatinate
 Lemberg (Stuttgart) (384 m), a hill between Weilimdorf and Feuerbach, Stuttgart
 Lemberg (Affalterbach) (365 m), a hill near Affalterbach, Baden-Württemberg
 Lemberg (Rabenau) (307 m), a hill in the municipality of Rabenau, Hesse

Other uses
Lemberg (horse) (1907-1928), a Thoroughbred racehorse

See also 

Lemberg Land (1340-1772), a subdivision of the Kingdom of Poland, with Lviv as its capital
Lemberg Ghetto (1941-1943), Lemberg, Lemberg, Ukraine; in WWII
Battle of Lemberg (disambiguation)
Lemberg pogrom (disambiguation)
Lemberger, a surname
Aivars Lembergs, Latvian politician and businessman
Lemberk Castle, in the Lusatian Mountains, the  Czech Republic
Lviv (disambiguation)
Lvov (disambiguation)
Lwów (disambiguation)